The Kanpur Central–Anand Vihar Terminal Express is an Express train belonging to North Central Railway zone that runs between  and  in India. It is currently being operated with 14151/14152 train numbers on a weekly basis.

Service

The 14151/Kanpur Central–Anand Vihar Terminal Express has an average speed of 46 km/hr and covers 479 km in 10h 30m. The 14152/Anand Vihar Terminal–Kanpur Central Express has an average speed of 41 km/hr and covers 479 km in 11h 45m.

Route and halts 

The important halts of the train are:

Coach composition

The train has LHB Rakes with max speed of 130 kmph. The train consists of 22 coaches:

 1 AC II Tier
 7 AC III Tier
 8 Sleeper coaches
 4 General
 2 End on Generator Cars

Traction

Both trains are hauled by a Kanpur Loco Shed-based WAP-7 electric locomotive from Kanpur to Delhi and vice versa.

Direction reversal

The train reverses its direction 1 times:

Rake sharing

The train shares its rake with 14151/14152 Kanpur Central–Bandra Terminus Weekly Express and 22445/22446 Kanpur Central–Amritsar Weekly Express.

See also 

 Kanpur Central railway station
 Anand Vihar Terminal railway station
 Kanpur Central–Bandra Terminus Weekly Express
 Kanpur Central–Amritsar Weekly Express

Notes

References

External links 

 14151/Kanpur–Anand Vihar Express 
 14152/Anand Vihar–Kanpur Express

Transport in Delhi
Trains from Kanpur
Express trains in India
Rail transport in Delhi
Railway services introduced in 2013